Giuseppe Rescigno (born 13 March 1934) is an Italian bobsledder. He competed in the four-man event at the 1968 Winter Olympics.

References

External links
 

1934 births
Living people
Italian male bobsledders
Olympic bobsledders of Italy
Bobsledders at the 1968 Winter Olympics
Sportspeople from the Province of Mantua